Alexis Puentes (born 1974), better known by his stage name Alex Cuba, is a Cuban-Canadian singer-songwriter who sings in Spanish and English. He has won two Juno Awards for World Music Album of the Year: in 2006 for Humo de Tabaco, and in 2008 for his second album, Agua del Pozo. In 2010 he won the Latin Grammy for Best New Artist. His 2015 album, Healer, earned him a Latin Grammy Award for Best Singer-Songwriter Album and a Grammy Award nomination for Best Latin Pop Album. His 2021 album Mendó won the 2022 Grammy for Best Latin Pop Album.

Biography 
Cuba was born in on March 29 in Cuba, spending his childhood in Artemisa, the son of guitar player and music teacher Valentin Puentes. He started playing guitar at age six. As an adult, he shifted into jazz fusion styles. He immigrated to Canada in 1999 after marrying a Canadian in Cuba. He and his twin brother Adonis first settled in Victoria, British Columbia, and worked as a duo called the Puentes Brothers, receiving a Juno Award nomination for Best Global Album at the Juno Awards of 2001. They parted ways as a band to launch solo careers in 2004. In 2003, Cuba moved to Smithers, British Columbia, the hometown of his wife, Sarah, whose father is politician Bill Goodacre. They have three children: Daniel, Rose and Owen Puentes.

Collaborators on his debut, Humo De Tabaco, include Ron Sexsmith and Corinne Bailey Rae. "Lo Mismo Que Yo," a duet with Sexsmith, became a hit in the UK Singles Chart, reaching No. 52.

In 2009, he co-wrote and recorded a duet with fellow Canadian Nelly Furtado. "Mi Plan" turned out to be the title track for her fourth studio album of the same name. Cuba co-wrote more than half of the songs on Furtado's album.

His music reflects primarily Latin and African influences, but with a mix of funk, jazz and pop.

He received a Latin Grammy on November 21, 2013.

In 2016, Cuba performed as part of the national Canada Day celebration on Parliament Hill in Ottawa.

His 2021 album Mendó won the 2022 Grammy for Best Latin Pop Album; it was his fourth nomination for the award and his first Grammy win.

Discography
 The Puentes Brothers:
 2001: Morumba Cubana
 Solo:
 2004: Humo de Tabaco
 2007: Agua del Pozo
 2009: Alex Cuba
 2012: Static in the System – "Ruido en el sistema"
 2015: Healer
 2017: "Lo Único Constante"
 2019: "Sublime"
 2021: "Mendó"

Awards and nominations

Grammy Awards
The Grammy Award is an accolade by the National Academy of Recording Arts and Sciences of the United States to recognize outstanding achievement on the music industry. Cuba has received four nominations.

|-
| 2011 || Alex Cuba || Best Latin Pop Album || 
|-
| 2016 || Healer || Best Latin Pop Album || 
|-
| 2018 || Lo Único Constante || Best Latin Pop Album || 
|-
| 2022 || Mendó || Best Latin Pop Album || 
|-

Latin Grammy Awards
A Latin Grammy Award is an accolade by the Latin Academy of Recording Arts & Sciences to recognize outstanding achievement in the music industry. Alex Cuba has received four awards out of five nominations.

|-
| rowspan=2|2010 || Alex Cuba || Best New Artist || 
|-
| Alex Cuba || Best Male Pop Vocal Album || 
|-
| 2012 || "Toma Mi Vida" || Best Tropical Song || 
|-
| 2013 || "Eres Tú" || Best Short Form Music Video || 
|-
| 2015 || Healer || Best Singer-Songwriter Album || 
|-

References

External links
 Alex Cuba official site
 Alex Cuba: Cuban Soul That Runs In The Family (NPR, November 15, 2009)

1974 births
Living people
People from Artemisa
Cuban emigrants to Canada
Canadian jazz guitarists
Canadian male guitarists
Canadian jazz singers
Canadian male singer-songwriters
Canadian singer-songwriters
Canadian world music musicians
Musicians from Victoria, British Columbia
Juno Award for Global Music Album of the Year winners
Latin Grammy Award for Best New Artist
Spanish-language singers of Canada
Afro-Cuban jazz musicians
Latin music songwriters
21st-century Canadian guitarists
21st-century Canadian male singers
Canadian male jazz musicians
Afro-Cuban jazz guitarists
Grammy Award winners